Kenya first participated at the Olympic Games in 1956, and has sent athletes to compete in every Summer Olympic Games since then, except for the boycotted 1976 and 1980 Games.  Kenya participated in the Winter Olympic Games in 1998, 2002, 2006 and 2018. Kenyan athletes have won 103 medals in total, all from boxing and track and field events, making them the most successful African committee at the Olympics. In terms of total medals won, the most recent Summer Olympics (2008, 2012, and 2016) have been Kenya's most successful, producing 42 medals between them.

The number of Kenyan women winning Olympic medals has risen dramatically, from their first in 1996 to more than half the Kenyan medals in 2016 (seven).

Increasingly, Kenya-born athletes are immigrating to compete in the Olympics for other countries, most notably Bahrain. In the 2016 Olympics, there were ~20 such athletes, including multiple medal winners.

The National Olympic Committee for Kenya is the National Olympic Committee Kenya, founded in 1955.

Medal tables

Medals by Summer Games

Medals by Winter Games

Medals by sport

List of medalists

Multiple medal winners

See also
 List of flag bearers for Kenya at the Olympics
 Kenya national athletics team
 :Category:Olympic competitors for Kenya
 Kenya at the Paralympics
 Tropical nations at the Winter Olympics

References

External links